

Leofwine was a medieval Bishop of Lindsey.

Leofwine was consecrated about 953 and died sometime after. This was a reconstitution of the see after a break in the succession since the death of Burgheard (or perhaps Eadberht) in the previous century. He combined the see with Dorchester in 956, and afterwards the combined see is usually known as Bishop of Lindsey. It appears to have covered Lindsey and Leicester.

Citations

References

External links
 

Bishops of Dorchester (Mercia)